Jinchuan County is a county in the northwest of Sichuan Province, China. It is under the administration of the Ngawa Tibetan and Qiang Autonomous Prefecture. The seat of county is Jinchuan Town (Rabden). 

The county spans an area of 5,524 square kilometers, and has a population of about 73,000 as of 2019.

Administrative divisions 
The county is divided into 3 towns and 19 townships. These township-level divisions are further divided into 112 village-level divisions.

Towns 
The county's 3 towns are as follows:

Townships 
The county's 19 townships are as follows:

 
 Qingning Township
 
 
 Hedong Township

History 
Prior to the 18th century, Greater Jinchuan was ruled by the Gyalrong Tibetan Chiefdom of Chuchen. In 1700, the kingdom of Trokyap submitted to the Qing rule. From 1747 to 1776, the Qing dynasty launched the Jinchuan campaigns to suppress the Jinchuan chiefdoms. 

The county briefly belonged to the Revolutionary Government of the  until 1935. In 1950, the People's Liberation Army conquered the county. The county was briefly renamed Dajinchuan County from 1953 to June 1959.

Geography
The county is bordered by Barkam to the north, Xiaojin County to the east, Zamtang County to the west, and Dawu County and Danba County to the south.

The county lies within the Dadu River basin. 42% of the county is forested.

Climate

References

 
Ngawa Tibetan and Qiang Autonomous Prefecture
County-level divisions of Sichuan